Complex Simplicity is the debut studio album by American singer Teedra Moses. It was released on August 10, 2004, by TVT Records. The album was produced largely by Paul Poli, with additional production from Raphael Saadiq and Lil Jon.

Singles
The album's lead single, "You'll Never Find (A Better Woman)", was released as a 12-inch vinyl in the United States on November 11, 2003. It was serviced to US rhythmic contemporary radio a week later, on November 18, 2003. The track, which features rapper Jadakiss, peaked at number 86 on Billboards Hot R&B/Hip-Hop Songs chart.

The second single, "Be Your Girl", was released as a 12-inch vinyl in the US on June 1, 2004, and impacted rhythmic and urban contemporary radio on the same day. It was also released as a CD single in Germany on February 21, 2005. The single reached number 87 on the Hot R&B/Hip-Hop Songs chart. The accompanying music video was directed by Hype Williams.

The third and final single, "You Better Tell Her", was released as a 12-inch vinyl on December 27, 2005. The single version features rappers Pitbull and Lil' Scrappy.

Critical reception

AllMusic's Andy Kellman lauded Complex Simplicity as "the best R&B album of 2004—if not the best pop-oriented R&B album since CrazySexyCool." Matt Cibula of PopMatters described the album as "awe-inspiring and cool and touching and kind of avant-garde in a weird homegrown way". Jon Caramanica of Rolling Stone wrote that Moses has "a cheery, twee voice, and on her debut she uses it to sass the men in her life." Patrick Taliaferro of Vibe viewed the album as "a great entry into the R&B game", adding that "Moses is appealing when revealing her country B-girl bravado, but at the end it's actually all we see, variations in her approach would have been nice." The album earned Moses comparisons to R&B artists such as Mary J. Blige, Deniece Williams, and Cherrelle.

Track listing
All tracks produced by Paul Poli, except where noted.

Notes
 The German edition of the album is enhanced to include the music video for "Be Your Girl".
 The Japanese edition features alternative artwork, but is otherwise identical to the North American release.
 The UK edition features alternative artwork as well.

Sample credits
 "Be Your Girl" contains replayed elements of "One on One", as performed by Nas
 "You'll Never Find (A Better Woman)" contains a sample of "Better Woman or Bigger Fool", as performed by Alicia Myers
 "No More Tears" contains replayed elements of "SpottieOttieDopaliscious", as performed by OutKast
 "Outta My Head" contains an interpolation of "Goin' Out of My Head", as performed by Little Anthony and the Imperials

Personnel
Credits adapted from the liner notes of Complex Simplicity.

 Teedra Moses – vocals, vocal arrangement ; executive production
 Rich Balmer – engineering 
 Gerry Brown – recording 
 Gerald Clayton – keyboards 
 Kevin Davis – mixing 
 Clare Fischer – string arrangements 
 Ryan Freeland – mixing ; engineering 
 John Frye – mixing 
 Tony Gillis – mastering
 Mark Gray – recording assistance 
 Jadakiss – vocals 
 Bryan Leach – co-executive production
 Anthony Mandler – photography
 Charles "Chaz" Muhammad – organ 
 Paul Poli – production, vocal arrangement ; engineering ; keyboards ; executive production
 Mac Robinson – guitar ; bass, keyboards, percussion 
 Danny Romero – recording ; mixing 
 Raphael Saadiq – bass, guitar, production, vocal arrangement, vocals 
 Greg Smith – recording 
 Jonathan Smith – production 
 Shaffer Smith – vocal arrangement 
 Benjamin Wheelock – design
 Dubbs Willie – executive production
 Kelvin Wooten – drums, guitar, keyboards

Charts

Release history

References

2004 debut albums
Albums produced by Lil Jon
Albums produced by Raphael Saadiq
Teedra Moses albums
TVT Records albums